José Manuel Pesudo Soler (11 June 1936 – 5 December 2003) was a Spanish football goalkeeper and coach.

His 17-year professional career, in which he appeared in 216 La Liga matches, was mainly associated with Valencia and Barcelona.

Club career
Born in Almassora, Province of Castellón, Pesudo arrived at Valencia CF in 1955 at the age of 19, going on to play with the reserves and neighbouring club Alicante CF before returning. After collecting 53 of his 63 La Liga appearances in his last two seasons, he signed for FC Barcelona, going on to win two titles with the Catalans, one individual (the 1965–66 edition of the Ricardo Zamora Trophy).

For most of his five-year spell, Pesudo battled for first-choice status at Barcelona with youth graduate Salvador Sadurní, but eventually had to leave in 1966, returning to Valencia and helping the Che to the Copa del Rey in his first year. He was also part of the squad that won the league in 1971, but did not appear in any games whatsoever during the campaign.

After two more years in the top flight, with Real Betis, suffering relegation in his second, Pesudo closed out his career at 38 after one season with Gimnàstic de Tarragona, in Segunda División. From 1976 to 1991 he worked as a manager, exclusively in his native region and in amateur football (he was in charge of Villarreal CF for one season in the 80s, with the club in Tercera División).

Death
On 5 December 2003, Pesudo died in Valencia due to a heart attack. He was 67 years old.

Honours

Club
Barcelona
Copa del Generalísimo: 1962–63
Inter-Cities Fairs Cup: 1965–66

Valencia
Copa del Generalísimo: 1966–67

Individual
Zamora Trophy: 1965–66

References

External links

CiberChe stats and bio 

1936 births
2003 deaths
People from Plana Alta
Sportspeople from the Province of Castellón
Spanish footballers
Footballers from the Valencian Community
Association football goalkeepers
La Liga players
Segunda División players
Valencia CF Mestalla footballers
Alicante CF footballers
Valencia CF players
FC Barcelona players
Real Betis players
Gimnàstic de Tarragona footballers
Spain B international footballers
Spanish football managers
Villarreal CF managers
CF Gandía managers